Carbonado may refer to:
 Carbonado, a natural polycrystalline diamond
 Carbonado, Washington, a town in Washington state